Catherine Jane Noakes  is a British mechanical engineer who is Professor of Environmental Engineering for Buildings at the University of Leeds. Noakes specialises in airborne infections and the transport of airborne pathogens. During the COVID-19 pandemic, Noakes served on the Government of the United Kingdom Scientific Advisory Group for Emergencies (SAGE).

Early life and education 
Noakes' parents had careers in computer science and aerospace engineering.

In 1996, Noakes received a BEng in mathematical engineering from the School of Mechanical Engineering at the University of Leeds. During this time she became interested in the mathematics of fluid dynamics. In 2000, Noakes received a PhD from the School of Mechanical Engineering at the University of Leeds, where she studied slow exit phenomena in slide-fed curtain coating systems, specifically for coating photographic paper, with a thesis entitled Slot Exit Flow Phenomena in Industrial Slide-Fed Coating Systems.

Research and career 
For a short time Noakes worked with the printing and coating company Delpro in Glossop, including on development of a drier used for coating Euro banknotes. However, in 2002 she moved to an academic post-doctoral position studying airflow and UV-C in disease prevention at the University of Leeds and subsequently gained a permanent position there.

Noakes investigates environmental fluid flow, with a focus on the ventilation of buildings and how this impacts indoor air quality. She develops mathematical models to assess the risk of airborne transmission, expanding on the Wells-Riley equation to include stochastic effects. As part of these efforts, Noakes has led collaborations with the National Health Service and Public Health England to prevent the spread of airborne viruses through hospitals. Airborne transmission is known to be an issue in tuberculosis and influenza. Noakes has developed computational tools to better monitor and control patient environments for infection control. In a presentation at the Bradford Festival of Science, Noakes revealed that one in fifty people acquire an infection during their time in hospital. The impact of these infections, and need for follow-up care, results in a major unnecessary expenditure.

In 2010 Noakes was made Director of the Pathogen Control Research Institute. Noakes is a member of the Engineering and Physical Sciences Research Council (EPSRC) Centre for Doctoral Training in Aerosol Science. Noakes was promoted to Professor in 2014. She serves on the editorial board of the Elsevier journal Building and Environment and the Wiley journal Indoor Air. From 2014 to 2017 Noakes led the University of Leeds Faculty of Engineering Athena SWAN scheme.

In 2016 Noakes started the Low-Energy Ventilation Network (LEVN), a team of people who look to better understand building physics. She has looked to understand whether indoor environments impact the cognitive performance of people inside. She serves as Deputy Director of the Leeds Institute of Fluid Dynamics, and co-directs their Centre for Doctoral Training.

During the COVID-19 pandemic, Noakes became interested in the airborne transmission of severe acute respiratory syndrome coronavirus 2 (SARS-CoV-2) and the related importance of ventilation to reduce the risk of inhaling small particles containing the virus. In April 2020 Noakes was appointed to the Government of the United Kingdom COVID-19 scientific advisory board.  As a result of this work Noakes was one of the recipients of the Royal Academy of Engineering President's Special Awards for Pandemic Service.

Noakes was the guest on the BBC Radio 4 programme The Life Scientific in January 2021. In September 2021 she was elected a Fellow of the Royal Academy of Engineering.

Honors
 2013: Institute of Healthcare Engineering and Estate Management, Fellow
 2014: Institution of Mechanical Engineers, Fellow
 2014: Institution of Mechanical Engineers, Construction and Building Services Division Prize
 2016: University of Leeds, Women of Achievement Award
 2018: International Society for Indoor Air Quality, Academy of Fellows
 2020: Appointed Officer of the Order of the British Empire (OBE) in the 2020 Birthday Honours for services to the COVID-19 response.
 2022: Chartered Institution of Building Services Engineers, Honorary Fellow

Selected publications

References

External links
 Catherine Noakes at the University of Leeds

Living people
Year of birth missing (living people)
British women engineers
Alumni of the University of Leeds
Academics of the University of Leeds
COVID-19 researchers
Aerosol scientists
21st-century women engineers
Fellows of the Royal Academy of Engineering
Female Fellows of the Royal Academy of Engineering
Fellows of the Institution of Mechanical Engineers
Officers of the Order of the British Empire